Divorce Court is a 1967 Australian TV series made by NLT Productions. Drama series featuring re-enactments of real-life cases heard in a divorce court.

References

External links
Divorce Court at AustLit

Nine Network original programming
Australian legal television series
1967 Australian television series debuts
1960s Australian drama television series
English-language television shows
Black-and-white Australian television shows